Francesco Miccichè may refer to:

Francesco Miccichè (bishop), (born 1943), Italian Roman Catholic prelate, Bishop of Trapani (1998–2012)
Francesco Miccichè (film director), (born 1966), Italian film director and screenwriter
Francesco Miccichè (politician), (born 1958), Italian politician and physician